Ahmadabad-e Daryab (also Romanized as Aḩmadābād-e Dāryāb; also known as Aḩmadābād, Aḩmadābād-e Pā’īn, and Aḩmadābād-e Soflá) is a village in Khezel-e Sharqi Rural District, Khezel District, Nahavand County, Hamadan Province, Iran. At the 2006 census, its population was 47, in 12 families.

References 

Populated places in Nahavand County